Eduard Mahir Sidra (born February 20, 1989 in Khartoum) is a Canadian soccer player. He is an attacking defender who often plays on the right side. He married Marie Gilada-Sidra on November 11, 2017.

Career
Eddy Sidra is now an Optometrist working in Dallas.

Club
Sidra began his career at the Green & Gold Soccer Academy of the University of Alberta for the Alberta Golden Bears in 2006. In October 2007 he had a trial with Energie Cottbus and signed later an amateur contract with them. Sidra played in his first season nineteen games for Energie Cottbus in the A-Junioren Bundesliga Season 2007–08 and in his second season fourteen in the Regionalliga Nord for Energie Cottbus II.

On January 28, 2011 Toronto FC of Major League Soccer verified that Sidra was one of three Canadian National team trialists that were traveling to Turkey for preseason camp. David Monsalve and midfielder Gianluca Zavarise were also on trial.

On April 2, 2011 FC Edmonton of the new North American Soccer League announced they had signed Sidra en route to their pre-season tour in Phoenix, Arizona.

The club released Sidra on October 12, 2011 after the conclusion of the 2011 season.

International
In 2009, Sidra played international matches (as a starter) for the Canadian National U-19, U-23 and Senior National Men's Teams. He was a starting selection for Canada at the 2009 CONCACAF Under-20 Men's Championship in Trinidad and Tobago. He earned his first call-up for the Canucks on May 26, 2009 and earned his first senior cap on May 30, 2009 in a friendly game against Cyprus. He was a standout in January 2010 in a friendly game against Jamaica, and in May 2010 a South American friendly match against Venezuela, where he had a run with the ball in extra time from left defense, going through the entire Venezuela team to the goal just outside the box, where he was fouled. A free kick was awarded, that set up the goal to tie, with no time left.  The outstanding run was played on highlight reels on sports televisions globally (https://www.youtube.com/watch?v=_ZYhIEKf6Jk). His national team positions have been versatile, playing as an attacking wing defender that jumps into the attack (like Roberto Carlos), as an attacking Midfielder (left & right) or as a stay at home defender. He typically plays the full 90 min of every game. Sidra was apparently contacted to play in the recent national team matches against Peru and Honduras but was ultimately not a part of the squad.

Honours
 2006–07: University of Alberta Golden Bears' soccer rookie of the year

References

External links
 Canada Soccer Profile
 Red Nation Interview with Eddy Sidra
 

1989 births
Living people
Association football defenders
Canada men's under-23 international soccer players
Canada men's youth international soccer players
Canadian expatriate soccer players
Canadian expatriate sportspeople in Germany
Canada men's international soccer players
Canadian soccer players
Expatriate footballers in Germany
FC Edmonton players
FC Energie Cottbus II players
Naturalized citizens of Canada
North American Soccer League players
Soccer players from Edmonton
2009 CONCACAF U-20 Championship players